Marion Franklin Tinsley (February 3, 1927 – April 3, 1995) was an American mathematician and checkers player. He is considered to be the greatest checkers player who ever lived. Tinsley was world champion 1955–1958 and 1975–1991 and never lost a world championship match, and lost only seven games (two of them to the Chinook computer program, one of them drunk, one of them in a simultaneous exhibition) from 1950 until his death in 1995. He withdrew from championship play during the years 1958–1975, relinquishing the title during that time.  Derek Oldbury, sometimes considered the second-best player of all time, thought that Tinsley was "to checkers what Leonardo da Vinci was to science, what Michelangelo was to art and what Beethoven was to music."

Early life and education
Tinsley was born in Ironton, Ohio, but spent his early life in Greenup County. Tinsley was the son of a school teacher and a farmer who became a sheriff. He had a sister and "felt unloved" by his parents. To gain the affection of his parents, he competed in math and spelling bees as a child.  He said of his parents' disapproval: "And as a twig is bent, it grows: As I grew up, I still kept feeling that way."

He skipped four of his first eight grades. He graduated from a Columbus high school at fifteen. Tinsley had a doctorate from Ohio State University in the mathematical discipline of combinatorial analysis. He worked as a professor of mathematics at Florida State University and Florida A&M University. Tinsley once claimed to have spent approximately 10,000 hours studying checkers while in graduate school. Tinsley also served as a lay preacher in the Disciples of Christ church.

Checkers career 
After reading a book by Millard Hopper, he became interested in the game.

He enlisted in the Navy in 1945 and was stationed at Gulfport, Mississippi, where he won the Southern Louisiana Open. In 1946, he finished second behind William F. Ryan at the Newark National Tourney, losing the finals 2-1-11. Tinsley won four Ohio State Opens (1946, 1947, 1948, 1949), six Cedar Point Tourneys (1946, 1949, 1950, 1951, 1952), and two Canadian Opens(1949, 1950).

Tinsley was an 8-time three-move world champion(1954, 1955, 1958, 1979, 1981, 1985, 1987, 1989) and once in two-move checkers(1952).

1951-1995 tournament record, excluding the Chinook games:

Chinook games
Tinsley retired from championship play in 1991. In August 1992, he defeated the Chinook computer program 4–2 (with 33 draws) in a match. Chinook had placed second at the U.S. Nationals in 1990 after Tinsley, which usually qualifies one to compete for the World Championships. However, the American Checkers Federation and the English Draughts Association refused to allow a computer to play for the title. Unable to appeal their decision, Tinsley resigned his title as World Champion and immediately indicated his desire to play against Chinook. The unofficial yet highly publicized match was quickly organized, and was won by Tinsley.

In one game from their match in 1990, Chinook, playing with white pieces, made a mistake on the tenth move. Tinsley remarked, "You're going to regret that."  Chinook resigned after move 36, only 26 moves later. The lead programmer Jonathan Schaeffer looked back into the database and discovered that Tinsley picked the only strategy that could have defeated Chinook from that point and Tinsley was able to see the win 64 moves into the future.

The ACF and the EDA were placed in the awkward position of naming a new world champion, a title which would be worthless as long as Tinsley was alive. The ACF granted Tinsley the title of World Champion Emeritus as a solution.

In August 1994, a second match with Chinook was organized, but Tinsley withdrew after only six games (all draws) for health reasons. Don Lafferty, rated the number two player in the world at the time, replaced Tinsley and fought Chinook to a drawn match at game 20. Tinsley was diagnosed with pancreatic cancer a week after the match, and died seven months later.

Death
Tinsley died in Humble, Texas, on April 3, 1995, at the age of 68.  He lived in Conyers, Georgia, but was visiting his sister in Texas when he died of cancer. He was survived by a twin sister, Mary Clark, who lives in Humble, Texas, and by two brothers, Ed, of Sarasota, Fla., and Joe, of Thornville, Ohio. He is buried at Greenlawn Cemetery, Columbus, Ohio, next to his father, Edward H. Tinsley, who was buried on November 19, 1948, and his mother, Viola Mae Tinsley, who was buried on June 1, 1987. His brother, Harold Edward Tinsley is also buried there, and was buried on July 6, 2007.

Television appearances
In 1957, Tinsley appeared as a guest challenger on the television game show To Tell the Truth.

See also
List of draughts players

References

External links
University of Alberta article on Tinsley

1927 births
1995 deaths
American checkers players
Players of English draughts
Baptists from Ohio
Ohio State University Graduate School alumni
Florida State University faculty
Florida A&M University faculty
Deaths from pancreatic cancer
People from Ironton, Ohio
Human versus computer matches
20th-century Baptists